Rebecca Lake or Lake Rebecca may refer to:

Places
 Lake Rebecca (Dakota County, Minnesota), United States
 Lake Rebecca (Hennepin County, Minnesota), United States
 Lake Rebecca (Western Australia), a lake in Western Australia
 Rebecca Lake, a lake in Ontario, Canada
 Rebecca Lake, Fayetteville, TN

Other uses
 A member of the New Zealand women's national under-20 football team
 Miss New Hampshire USA, 1992